Torrey Peak may refer to:

 Torrey Peak (Wyoming) in Wyoming, USA
 Torrey Peak (Texas) in Texas, USA (see )
 Torreys Peak in Colorado, USA